A total lunar eclipse took place on Sunday, January 30, 1972, the first of two lunar eclipses in 1972. The moon entered the Earth's penumbral shadow at 30 January 1972 08:03:12.5 UTC and exited at 30 January 1972 13:43:37.9 UTC. The moon entered the Earth's umbral shadow at 30 January 1972 09:11:38.4 UTC and exited at 30 January 1972 12:35:03.1 UTC. Totality lasted 34 minutes, 47.7 seconds (34.795 min), between 10:35:57.4 UTC and 11:10:45.1 UTC. The moon was 6.6 days before apogee (Apogee on Sunday, February 6, 1972), making it 1.6% smaller than average, only 0.2% larger than the July 1972's lunar eclipse.

Visibility
It was completely visible over eastern Asia, New Zealand, northwestern North America, seen rising over Asia and Australia and setting over North America and western South America.

Relation to other lunar eclipses

Eclipses in 1972
 An annular solar eclipse on Sunday, 16 January 1972.
 A total lunar eclipse on Sunday, 30 January 1972.
 A total solar eclipse on Monday, 10 July 1972.
 A partial lunar eclipse on Wednesday, 26 July 1972.

Lunar year series

Half-Saros cycle
A lunar eclipse will be preceded and followed by solar eclipses by 9 years and 5.5 days (a half saros). This lunar eclipse is related to two annular solar eclipses of Solar Saros 140.

See also
List of lunar eclipses
List of 20th-century lunar eclipses

Notes

External links

1972-01
1972 in science
January 1972 events